Anders Hauge (born 1975) is a Norwegian ski-orienteering competitor. He received a silver medal in the relay event at the 2004 World Ski Orienteering Championships in Östersund, together with Øystein Kvaal Østerbø, Tommy Olsen and Eivind Tonna. He placed 11th in the long distance, 8th in the middle distance, and 14th in the sprint at the 2004 World Championships. He competed at the 2005 World Championships in Levi, and placed 15th in the sprint and sixth in the relay. 

Hauge is 6 times individual national champion in ski orienteering. He is also 9 times national champion in ski orienteering, relay, representing Asker skiklubb.

References

1975 births
Living people
Norwegian orienteers
Male orienteers
Ski-orienteers
21st-century Norwegian people